Bilateral may refer to any concept including two sides, in particular:

Bilateria, bilateral animals
Bilateralism, the political and cultural relations between two states
Bilateral, occurring on both sides of an organism (Anatomical terms of location § Medial and lateral)
Bilateral symmetry, symmetry between two sides of an organism
Bilateral filter, an image processing algorithm
Bilateral amplifier, a type of amplifier
Bilateral (album), an album by the band Leprous
Bilateral school, see Partially selective school (England)